Taking a Stand: Moving Beyond Partisan Politics to Unite America is a book by United States Senator Rand Paul of Kentucky. The book was released on May 26, 2015, by Center Street, a main publishing division of Hachette Book Group USA. It happened to coincide with Paul's filibuster in the United States Senate of the PATRIOT Act provisions which were expected to expire at midnight on June 1, 2015.

Paul had previously engaged in a filibuster of the nomination of John O. Brennan as Director of the Central Intelligence Agency in 2013, which led to his campaign team coining the phrase "Stand With Rand."

See also
 The Tea Party Goes to Washington
 Government Bullies

References

External links
 Taking a Stand by Rand Paul official publisher website
 Rand Paul: Taking a Stand official book website
 Office of Senator Rand Paul official U.S. Senate website

2015 non-fiction books
Books about the 2016 United States presidential election
American political books
Non-fiction books about elections
Books about ideologies
Books by Rand Paul
Books in political philosophy
Tea Party movement
Center Street (publisher) books